The Andhra Pradesh State Disaster Response and Fire Services Department is the agency responsible for fire protection and disaster management in the Indian state of Andhra Pradesh.

The department issues No Objection Certificates for buildings that adhere to fire safety norms. The department also has the right to penalise violators of fire safety norms.

In 2013, the department announced an initiative to improve efficiency by equipping fire engines with GPS devices and cameras to help track locations of fire.

The department had 265 fire stations in 2014 prior to bifurcation of the state. Post bifurcation, 173 are located in Andhra Pradesh, while the remaining are located in Telangana.

References

External links 
Official Website

Fire departments of India
State agencies of Andhra Pradesh
1956 establishments in Andhra Pradesh